Ralph Peake  is a former Member of the House of Keys (the lower house of Tynwald, the Isle of Man parliament) for Douglas North and candidate in the 2021 Manx General Election. Peake served as a Member of the Island's Department of Environment, Food and Agriculture, Department of Health and Social Care, and Economic Policy Review Committee.

Biography
He was elected for Douglas North in the 2015 by-election, receiving 604 votes. He was re-elected in the general election in 2016.

Election results

2015

2016

References 

Living people
Members of the House of Keys 2011–2016
Members of the House of Keys 2016–2021
1962 births